Coolidge Corner is a light rail stop on the MBTA Green Line C branch, located at the intersection of Beacon Street and Harvard Street in the Coolidge Corner neighborhood of Brookline, Massachusetts. With 3,440 daily boardings by a 2011 count, it had more than twice the ridership of any other surface station on the branch.

History

Horsecar service on the Beacon Street line began between Coolidge Corner and downtown Boston on June 1, 1888. Electrified service began between Allston and downtown Boston via Coolidge Corner on January 3, 1889. Service was extended west from Coolidge Corner to Reservoir on January 12, and from Allston to  the next day.

On February 3, 1900, the Boston Elevated Railway (BERy) established Coolidge Corner as a designated transfer point, where passengers could transfer between the Reservoir and Oak Square branches. The town approved the construction of shelters at the stop in November 1900, and they were completed in 1901. Similar shelters were built around 1912 at Brookline Village, but demolished in 1938. A 1911-built electrical substation designed by Peabody and Stearns is located in Coolidge Corner on Webster Street.

In the early 2000s, the MBTA modified key surface stops with raised platforms for accessibility. Portable lifts were installed at Coolidge Corner around 2000 as a temporary measure. The platform modifications – part of a $32 million modification of thirteen B, C, and E branch stations – were completed in 2001.

The MBTA added wooden mini-high platforms, allowing level boarding on older Type 7 LRVs, at eight Green Line stations in 2006–07 as part of the settlement of Joanne Daniels-Finegold, et al. v. MBTA.

References

External links

MBTA – Coolidge Corner
Station from Harvard Street from Google Maps Street View

Green Line (MBTA) stations
Railway stations in Brookline, Massachusetts